Brooklyn Funk Essentials is a music collective who mix jazz, funk, and hip hop, featuring musicians and poets from different cultures. The band was conceived in 1993 by producer Arthur Baker and bassist and musical director Lati Kronlund. In the mid-1990s, the group became a staple of the New York City club scene.

Their debut album Cool and Steady and Easy (1995) scored an underground hit with the rendition of Pharoah Sanders' "The Creator Has a Master Plan". The following album, In the BuzzBag (1998), included Turkish folk music rhythms and instruments, recorded in consortium with the Turkish clarinettist Hüsnü Şenlendirici. Further albums followed in 2000 and 2009 which more resembled their first offering.

Musicians involved
Musicians involved in Brooklyn Funk Essentials' projects include:
Hanifah Walidah (aka Sha-Key) (vocals)
Joi Cardwell (vocals)
Papa Dee (vocals)
Everton Sylvester (vocals)
Ipec Scnot (vocals)
Stephanie McKay (vocals)
Everton Sylvester (poets)
Cengizhan Elibol (drums)
David Allen (poets)
Jazzy Nice (DJ)
Yuka Honda (keyboard)
Josh Roseman (trombone)
Paul Shapiro (saxophone)
Yancy Drew Lambert (vocals, drums)
E.J. Rodriguez (percussion)
Lati Kronlund (guitar, bass)
Yıldıran Göz (oud)
"Bassy" Bob Brockmann (trumpet, flugelhorn)
David Jensen (tenor saxophone)
Iwan van Hetten (keyboard, trumpet)
Anna Brooks (tenor / soprano saxophone)

Discography

Albums

Stay Good (2019)

Track listing
Stay Good 6:50
Ain't Nothing 3:49
No Strings 3:40
Watcha Want From Me 4:28
Miss Mess 5:33
Keep The Love 4:29
Funk Ain't Ova 3:52
Breeze On Me 4:26
Bakabana 3:12
Y Todavia La Quiero 7:19
Steps 5:23
Where Love Lives 3:45

Funk Ain't Ova (2015)

Track listing
 Blast It! 4:44 
 Dance Or Die 4:53 
 I'm Gonna Find Me A Woman (Cause It's Cold Outside) 4:59
 Prepare 4:38 
 Hold It Down 4:14 
 Set It Off 4:59 
 Hook 4:28 
 Gabriel 4:58 
 Brooklyn Love 4:37 
 Recycled 5:31 
 Unique 5:37

Watcha Playin (2008)

Track listing
 Need 12:40
 Dance - Free Night 4:46
 Bellybuttons T&a 5:00
 Rude Boy Shuffle 6:38
 The Park 4:11
 Wendell Wedding 5:32
 For A Few Dollars More 8:09
 Work It Out 6:10
 My Jamaican Girl 5:19
 Dibby Dibby Sound 2:31
 S-curved 7:46
 The Day Before Adidi 6:12

Make Them Like It (2000)

Track listing
 Make Them Like It 4:22 	
 Mambo Con Dancehall 6:48 	
 Date With Baby 5:07 	
 Woman Thing 6:20 	
 I Got Cash 4:50 	
 Confirm Reservation 6:13 	
 Kik It 6:00 	
 Jump Around Sound 4:41 	
 Hard To Stop/Feelgood 6:46 	
 Vinyl Crisis 5:38 	
 To My Peeps 1:07 	
 Martha 4:59 	
 Bill's Playground 4:17

In the BuzzBag (1998)

Track listing
 By And Bye  – 5:34
 Istanbul Twilight  – 6:51
 Magick Karpet Ride  – 5:06
 In The BuzzBag  – 6:27
 Keep It Together  – 7:26
 Selling Out  – 5:56
 Ska Ka-Bop  – 4:50
 You Don't Know Nothing  – 5:04
 Freeway To Üsküdar  – 4:57
 Zurna Preserve  – 8:47

Cool and Steady and Easy (1995)

Track listing
 Take The L Train (To B'klyn) 5:50
 The Creator Has A Master Plan 5:51
 The Revolution Was Postponed Because Of Rain 4:59
 Bop Hop 5:13 
 Brooklyn Recycles 5:25 	
 Mizz Bed-Stuy 4:10 	
 A Headnaddas Journey To The Planet Adidi-Skizm 6:15
 Big Apple Boogaloo 6:21 
 Blow Your Brains Out 4:59
 Stickman Crossing The Brooklyn Bridge 7:27
 Dilly Dally 5:10 
 Take The L Train (To 8th Ave.) 4:05

Singles/EPs
Mambo Con Dancehall [12"] (2000)
Mambo Con Dancehall [CD] (2000)
Make Them Like It (Sampler) (2000)
Magick Karpet Ride (1999)
Big Apple Boogaloo (1997)
Creator Has a Master Plan [Cassette Single] (1995)
Creator Has a Master Plan [CD Single] (1995)

References

Musical groups from New York (state)
Acid jazz ensembles